The canton of Champs-sur-Marne is a French administrative division, located in the arrondissement of Torcy, in the Seine-et-Marne département (Île-de-France région).

Demographics

Composition 
At the French canton reorganisation which came into effect in March 2015, the canton was expanded from 2 to 4 communes:
Champs-sur-Marne  
Croissy-Beaubourg
Lognes
Noisiel

See also
Cantons of the Seine-et-Marne department
Communes of the Seine-et-Marne department

References

Champs-sur-Marne